Amphicosmus is a genus of bee flies (insects in the family Bombyliidae). There are about five described species in Amphicosmus.

Species
These five species belong to the genus Amphicosmus:
 Amphicosmus arizonensis Johnson & Johnson, 1960 i c g b
 Amphicosmus arizonicus Hall, 1975 i c g b
 Amphicosmus cincturus Williston, 1901 i c g
 Amphicosmus elegans Coquillett, 1891 i c g
 Amphicosmus vanduzeei Cole, 1923 i c g
Data sources: i = ITIS, c = Catalogue of Life, g = GBIF, b = Bugguide.net

References

Further reading

 

Bombyliidae genera
Articles created by Qbugbot